Łapalice  (
) is a village in the administrative district of Gmina Kartuzy, within Kartuzy County, Pomeranian Voivodeship, in northern Poland.

For details of the history of the region, see History of Pomerania.

The village has a population of 787.

The so-called "castle Łapalice" is the largest unauthorized construction ever developed in Poland. Started in 1984, it was closed by officials during 90-ies and is now the subject to legal battle between the owner and authorities. It has become an unofficial tourist attraction since, however the site is fenced and visiting is illegal.

References

Villages in Kartuzy County